IgG4-related disease (IgG4-RD), formerly known as IgG4-related systemic disease, is a chronic inflammatory condition characterized by tissue infiltration with lymphocytes and IgG4-secreting plasma cells, various degrees of fibrosis (scarring) and a usually prompt response to oral steroids. In approximately 51–70% of people with this disease, serum IgG4 concentrations are elevated during an acute phase.

It is a relapsing-remitting disease associated with a tendency to mass forming, tissue-destructive lesions in multiple sites, with a characteristic histopathological appearance in whichever site is involved. Inflammation and the deposition of connective tissue in affected anatomical sites can lead to organ dysfunction, organ failure, or even death if not treated.

Early detection is important to avoid organ damage and potentially serious complications. Treatment is recommended in all symptomatic cases of IgG4-RD and also in asymptomatic IgG4-RD involving certain anatomical sites.

Signs and symptoms
IgG4-related disease has been described as an indolent condition. Although possibly based on opinion rather than on objective assessments, symptoms, if any, are commonly described as mild in the medical literature.
This can be in spite of considerable underlying organ destruction. People are often described as being generally well at the time of diagnosis, although some may give a history of weight loss.
Pain is generally not a feature of inflammation. However, it may occur as a secondary effect, for example, due to either obstruction or compression.

Laboratory levels of IGG4 greater than 135

Moreover, diagnosis is made due to the presence of painless swellings or mass lesions, or due to complications of masses, e.g. jaundice due to involvement of the pancreas, biliary tree or liver. Symptoms are commonly attributed to other conditions and other diagnoses may have been made years before diagnosis, e.g. urinary symptoms in men attributed to common prostate conditions. Lesions may also be detected incidentally on radiological images, but can be easily misdiagnosed as malignancies.

Reported cases do include some significant symptoms or findings however:

Individual organ manifestations
IgG4-RD can involve one or multiple sites in the body. With multiorgan involvement, the sites involved can be affected at the same time (synchronously) or at different unrelated periods (metachronously).

Several different diseases that have been known for many years are now considered to be manifestations of IgG4-RD. These include: type 1 autoimmune pancreatitis, interstitial nephritis, Riedel's thyroiditis, Mikulicz's disease, Küttner's tumor, inflammatory pseudotumors (in various sites of the body), mediastinal fibrosis and some cases of retroperitoneal fibrosis.

This is not a complete list, as IgG4-RD can involve any site in the body.

Other affected sites, confirmed on histology to be manifestations of IgG4-RD, include:
heart; hard palate, esophagus, stomach, small intestine, rectum, adrenal gland, ovary, uterus, ureter, bladder, urachus, and synovium. Approximately 1/3 of cases exhibit increases in blood eosinophil counts, either eosinophilia or hypereosinophilia.

Radiologic evidence suggestive of involvement of the superior vena cava and seminal vesicle has been reported in confirmed cases of IgG4-RD.

Histology
Whatever area of the body is involved, the hallmark histopathological features of IgG4-RD are:
 A dense lymphoplasmacytic (lymphocytes and plasma cells) infiltrate rich in IgG4-positive plasma cells.
 IgG4 immunostaining needs to be specifically requested and performed in order to detect IgG4-positive plasma cells.
 Fibrosis, arranged at least focally in a "storiform" pattern.
 "Storiform" is commonly referred to as meaning 'having a cartwheel pattern', but its literal meaning is the appearance of 'a woven mat [Latin: ] (of rush or straw)'.
 Obliterative phlebitis.
 The venous channels are obliterated by a dense lymphoplasmacytic infiltrate, within both the venous walls and the lumen.

Other histopathological features associated with IgG4-RD are:
 Phlebitis without obliteration of the lumen.
 Tissue has increased numbers of eosinophils.

Submandibular gland research 

In an article from 1977, histological research into 349 cases of Küttner's tumor (now known as 'IgG4-related sialadenitis') identified four distinct stages of the fibroinflammatory process:
 Stage 1: Focal periductal (around the salivary ducts) infiltration of lymphocytes
 Stage 2: Diffuse infiltration of lymphocytes and severe periductal fibrosis (scarring around the salivary ducts)
 Stage 3: Prominent infiltration of lymphocytes, atrophy of parenchyma (i.e. loss of functional areas due to shrinkage), and periductal sclerosis (scarring resulting in hardening around the salivary ducts)
 Stage 4: Marked loss of and sclerosis (hardening) of the parenchyma (functional area) - similar to the process involved in cirrhosis where there is shrinkage and loss of functional areas of the liver

This may reflect the inflammatory process and development of fibrosis that occurs in other organs involved in IgG4-RD.

Diagnosis

Diagnosis requires tissue biopsy of an affected organ with characteristic histological findings, a comprehensive medical history and physical examination from a physician astute 
in new and evolving connective tissue diseases such as IgG4-RD.

Serum immunoglobulin G4 (IGG4) is often elevated, but this is not always the case. However, IgG4 blood lab levels greater than 135 are considered an evolving diagnostic criterion for disease suspicion

Treatment
The goal of treatment is the induction and maintenance of remission so as to prevent progression of fibrosis and organ destruction in affected organ(s).

An international panel of experts have developed recommendations for the management of IgG4-RD. They concluded that in all cases of symptomatic, active IgG4-RD that treatment is required. Some cases with asymptomatic IgG4-RD also require treatment, as some organs tend to not cause symptoms until the late stages of disease. Urgent treatment is advised with certain organ manifestations, such as aortitis, retroperitoneal fibrosis, proximal biliary strictures, tubulointerstitial nephritis, pachymeningitis, pancreatic enlargement and pericarditis.

Induction of remission
In untreated patients with active disease, the recommended first-line agent for induction of remission is glucocorticoids unless contraindications exist. Glucocorticoids characteristically result in a rapid and often dramatic improvement in clinical features and often a resolution of radiographic features. However, where advanced fibrotic lesions have resulted in irreversible damage, the response to glucocorticoids and other current treatment options may be poor or even absent.

Although not validated yet in clinical trials, the common induction regime is prednisolone 30–40 mg per day for 2–4 weeks, then gradually tapered over 3 to 6 months. Recurrences during or after tapering of glucocorticoids are frequent, however. Steroid-sparing immunosuppressive agents might be considered, depending on local availability of these drugs, for use in combination with glucocorticoids from the start of treatment in order to reduce the side-effects of prolonged glucocorticoid usage. Steroid-sparing agents that have been used include rituximab, azathioprine, methotrexate, and cyclophosphamide, although trials are needed to ascertain the effectiveness of each drug in IgG4-RD.

Maintenance
Following a successful induction of remission, maintenance therapy might be given in some cases, for example when there is a high risk of relapse or in patients with organ-threatening manifestations. Common maintenance therapy is prednisolone 2.5–5 mg per day, or use of a steroid-sparing agent instead.

Relapse
Relapses are common, and a previous history of relapse appears to be a strong predictor of future relapse. When relapse occurs while off therapy and there has been a prolonged disease remission following initial glucocorticoid induction, then the relapse can usually be managed successfully with a re-induction strategy using glucocorticoids. Introducing a steroid-sparing agent might also need to be considered for relapses; however, none has been tested in prospective, controlled studies, and evidence for their efficacy beyond that offered by concomitant glucocorticoid therapy is scarce.

In one retrospective cohort study, baseline concentrations of serum IgG4, IgE and blood eosinophils were found to be independently predictive of relapse risk following treatment with rituximab with or without glucocorticoids; the higher the baseline values, the greater the relapse risk and the shorter the time to relapse.

Other interventions
When organ involvement causes local mechanical problems, further organ-specific interventions may be necessary. For example, when a tumefactive lesion causes obstruction of the bile duct, it may be necessary to insert a biliary stent to allow the bile to drain freely.

Similarly, ureteral or vascular stents, surgical resection or radiotherapy may be considered for various different presenting problems.

Trials
Research is also underway to evaluate the effect and safety of plasmablast-directed therapy with a monoclonal antibody (XmAb5871) which inhibits B-cell function without depleting these immune cells. XmAb5871 targets CD19 with its variable domain and has an Fc domain that has increased affinity to FcγRIIb.

Epidemiology
As recognition of IgG4-RD is relatively recent, there are limited studies on its epidemiology. It is therefore difficult to make an accurate estimation of prevalence. Furthermore, age of onset is almost impossible to estimate; age at diagnosis is frequently misused as the age of onset.

A 2011 study estimated the incidence of IgG4-RD in Japan at 2.8–10.8/million population, with a median age of onset of 58 years.

Nomenclature

Prior to 2011, IgG4-RD used to get mentioned in the medical literature under various different names.

At the 2011 International Symposium on IgG4-Related Diseases , the consensus name of IgG4-related disease was endorsed for the condition. This name had already been agreed upon as a consensus name among Japanese investigators, notably choosing not to use the term 'systemic' as that might lead to malignant tumours in other organs getting incorrectly diagnosed as being just another manifestation of the IgG4-related condition.

However, some experts at the international symposium did express reservations about naming the disease after IgG4, as its role in pathogenesis is questionable and the use of serum IgG4 concentrations as a biomarker is unreliable.

An expanded term, 'Immunoglobulin G4-related disease', has sometimes been used also. However, this term was never referenced in the 2012 recommendations for nomenclature, and its use would appear to be erroneous.

See also
 IgG4-related ophthalmic disease
 IgG4-related prostatitis
 IgG4-related skin disease

References

External links 

 Overview of IgG4-related disease - UpToDate's article on IgG4-related disease.
 DermNet NZ entry

 
Immune system disorders
Autoimmune diseases
Pancreas disorders
Salivary gland pathology
Hepatology
Steroid-responsive inflammatory conditions